Josip Ćalušić (born 11 October 1993) is a Croatian footballer who plays as a centre-back for Serbian club TSC Bačka Topola. He has also represented Croatia at youth level.

Career
Ćalušić made his league debut for Dinamo Zagreb on 27 February 2013 against Hajduk Split.

Honours
Dinamo Zagreb
Croatian First League: 2012–13
Croatian Super Cup: 2013

Celje
Slovenian PrvaLiga: 2019–20

References

External links

1993 births
Living people
Footballers from Split, Croatia
Association football central defenders
Croatian footballers
Croatia youth international footballers
Croatia under-21 international footballers
NK Lokomotiva Zagreb players
NK Sesvete players
GNK Dinamo Zagreb players
GNK Dinamo Zagreb II players
NK Celje players
FK TSC Bačka Topola players
First Football League (Croatia) players
Croatian Football League players
Slovenian PrvaLiga players
Serbian SuperLiga players
Croatian expatriate footballers
Expatriate footballers in Slovenia
Croatian expatriate sportspeople in Slovenia
Expatriate footballers in Serbia
Croatian expatriate sportspeople in Serbia